Unión Juventud is a Peruvian football club, playing in the city of Chimbote, Peru.

History
The club was founded on 1956 and currently play in the Copa Perú, which is the third division of the Peruvian football system.

In 2012 Copa Perú, the club classified to the Regional Stage, but was eliminated by Cruzeiro Porcón and Juventud Bellavista

Honours

Regional
Liga Departamental de Ancash:
Winners (2): 1991, 2012

Liga Provincial de Santa:
Winners (2): 2012, 2022
Runner-up (1): 2004

Liga Distrital de Chimbote:
Winners (9): 1978, 1990, 1993, 1998, 2005, 2006, 2012, 2015, 2022
Runner-up (3): 1970, 2004, 2019

See also
List of football clubs in Peru
Peruvian football league system

References

External links
 Official Website

Football clubs in Peru
Association football clubs established in 1956